Nagbukel, officially the Municipality of Nagbukel, is a 5th class municipality in the province of Ilocos Sur, Philippines. According to the 2020 census, it has a population of 5,465 people.

Etymology
The name of the municipality was thought to have come from the round shape of one of the hills in the area.  People in the area would utter, "Anian nga nagbukel" (Ilocano meaning "How round it is.").

Another origin of the municipality's name comes from three small hills in the southern part of the municipality.

Another origin of the town's name comes from the irregular distribution of the barangays of Nagbukel and nearby Narvacan.  Negotiations were made in such a way that the place east of the Kayapa River become part of Nagbukel and places west of the river become part of Narvacan.  The distance from north to south was equal to the distance from east to west.  The resulting area is round, hence the name "Nagbukel."

The barrios which composed the municipality today were formerly a part of Narvacan.  However, in 1896, Nagbukel became a town under the Spanish Government.  It was only in 1899 when the town became a regular municipality.

Geography

Barangays
Nagbukel is politically subdivided into 12 barangays. These barangays are headed by elected officials: Barangay Captain, Barangay Council, whose members are called Barangay Councilors. All are elected every three years.
 Balaweg
 Bandril
 Bantugo
 Cadacad
 Casilagan
 Cosocos
 Lapting
 Mapisi
 Mission
 Poblacion East
 Poblacion West
 Taleb

Climate

Demographics

In the 2020 census, Nagbukel had a population of 5,465.

Economy

Government
Nagbukel, belonging to the second congressional district of the province of Ilocos Sur, is governed by a mayor designated as its local chief executive and by a municipal council as its legislative body in accordance with the Local Government Code. The mayor, vice mayor, and the councilors are elected directly by the people through an election which is being held every three years.

Elected officials

References

External links
Pasyalang Ilocos Sur
Philippine Standard Geographic Code
Philippine Census Information
Local Governance Performance Management System

Municipalities of Ilocos Sur